The mountains and hills of England comprise very different kinds of terrain, from a mountain range which reaches almost  high, to several smaller areas of lower mountains, foothills and sea cliffs. Most of the major upland areas have been designated as Areas of Outstanding Natural Beauty (AONB) or national parks. The highest and most extensive areas are in the north and west (including south-west), while the midlands, south-east and east of the country tend to be low-lying.

Northern England

Lake District

The North of England includes the country's highest mountains, in the Lake District of Cumbria. This was one of the first national parks to be established in the United Kingdom, in 1951. The highest peak is Scafell Pike, and at least three other summits exceed  making them Furth Munros. The mountains are chiefly Ordovician slates and volcanic rocks, with some limestone and outcrops of other rock types. The peaks were catalogued and described in Alfred Wainwright's seminal Pictorial Guide to the Lakeland Fells series of books, which listed 214 summits, which have subsequently become known as Wainwrights.

Border Moors and Forests
North of Hadrian's Wall and the Tyne Valley, the land rises to form the Border Moors and Forests, an upland plateau near the southern Anglo-Scottish border. It includes Kielder Water and the Kielder Forest and parts of the area lie in the Northumberland National Park.

Cheviot Hills
The Cheviot Hills lie north of the Border Moors, which extend into Scotland and could probably be considered part of either the Southern Uplands or the northern Pennines. They are also included in the Northumberland National Park.

Pennines

The North Pennines (an Area of Outstanding Natural Beauty, or AONB) lie south of Hadrian's Wall and the Tyne Gap, and east of the Lake District, from which they are separated by the Eden Valley.

South of this, the main line of the Pennines (often called "the backbone of England") continues into the Yorkshire Dales around the Stainmore Gap, a limestone-dominated area of broad valleys and moorland. The Yorkshire Three Peaks are some of the highest summits in the area, which became a national park in 1954.

The Yorkshire Dales end at the Aire Gap, and a short distance to the south is a range of moorland that rises up between the urban cores of Greater Manchester and West Yorkshire. The range has no continuous name - the western part as far as Blackburn is called the West Pennine Moors, the eastern part north of the A646 (including the famous Ilkley Moor) is called the South Pennines, and the small area in between is known as the Forest of Rossendale. These three groups of hills are dominated by peat bogs over Millstone Grit, and merge into the northern part of the Peak District, known as the Dark Peak, around the Tame Valley, Standedge and Holme Valley. These areas of West Yorkshire are marketed as "Brontë country", and the local landscape provided inspiration for many of the works of the Brontë sisters, including most famously, Wuthering Heights.

The Forest of Bowland AONB, in Lancashire is a western spur of the Pennines. It is separated from the surrounding Yorkshire Dales and South Pennines by the Aire Gap and Ribble Valley. The isolated Pendle Hill falls within the boundaries of the AONB.

The Peak District was another of the original national parks designated in 1951, and remains one of the most popular in the country, largely because of its proximity to several large cities. One end of the Pennine Way, the first long-distance footpath in the British Isles, is in Edale, in the Peak District, while the other end is at Kirk Yetholm, in the Southern Uplands of Scotland.

The southern part of the Peak District (White Peak), around Buxton and the Hope Valley, is another limestone area, with a number of caves, especially around Castleton. The Peak District marks the southern end of the Pennine chain, as it peters out into the lowlands of the English Midlands around the Trent Valley.

Howgill Fells
The Howgill Fells are an area of uplands in Cumbria lying between the Lake District and the Yorkshire Dales. The area falls within the boundaries of the Yorkshire Dales National Park and are sometimes considered as a western spur of the Pennines.

Orton Fells
The Orton Fells are an area of limestone uplands in Cumbria lying between the Lake District and the Eden Valley. The area mostly falls within the boundaries of the Yorkshire Dales National Park with a small part lying in the Lake District National Park. Like the Howgill Fells, the area may be considered a western spur of the Pennines as it predominantly lies in the Yorkshire Dales National Park.

North York Moors
Near the North Yorkshire coastal towns of Whitby and Scarborough, and extending inland as far as Thirsk, the North York Moors are one of the few major upland areas in eastern England. The Jurassic limestone rocks are rich in fossils, which are regularly exposed by erosion of the sea cliffs.

Midlands

The English Midlands are predominantly flat in character, although isolated hills such as Turners Hill can command extensive views.

The Malverns are made from some of the oldest rock in England (around 680 million years old) and extend some  through two West Midlands counties Worcestershire and Herefordshire as well as northern Gloucestershire in the southwest.

Areas of lower hills in the Midlands include Cannock Chase in Staffordshire, Charnwood Forest in Leicestershire and the Lincolnshire Wolds.

South East England
South East England, including East Anglia and London, is predominantly low lying. The underlying rock is chalk, and meaningful elevations are only attained in the Chiltern Hills, the North Wessex Downs, the North Downs and the South Downs (which includes the chalk cliffs at Beachy Head and Seven Sisters).

South West England

South of Bristol and Bath, the Mendip Hills are the first group of hills in South West England. The Purbeck Hills (and their continuation onto the Isle of Wight) line the south coast, and a number of other groups of hills are also present in the area: the Quantock Hills, Blackdown Hills, Dorset Downs, Salisbury Plain and Cranborne Chase. Glastonbury Tor, although of only modest height, is significant for its claimed association with Arthurian legend.

The highest and largest upland areas in the south-west are, however, the moors of the South-west Peninsula. Exmoor, in northern Somerset, and abutting the Bristol Channel, reaches  at Dunkery Beacon, and is famous as the setting of Lorna Doone.

Bodmin Moor, further to the south-west, is smaller, and is perhaps best known for the Beast of Bodmin Moor. Like Dartmoor, it is a granite plateau, whereas Exmoor is formed from Devonian sediments.

See also
Hill lists in the British Isles
List of English counties by highest point
List of Hewitts and Nuttalls in England

References